John Robertson Architects (JRA) is an architectural practice based in Bankside, London, which was founded by its Director John Robertson in 1993. The practice concentrates on the design and implementation of new build, retrofit, historic refurbishment and restoration projects in Central London. It is a member of the AJ100, consisting of the 100 largest architecture practices in the UK. JRA is a foundation member of the Landaid Appeal.

Selected projects 
 Bloom Clerkenwell, Farringdon Oversite Development, EC1
101 Moorgate, Liverpool Street Crossrail Oversite Development, EC2
BankMed HQ, Beirut, Lebanon
10 Park Drive, London E14
Bracken House, London EC4
Bush House, London WC2
33 King William Street, London EC4
 51 Moorgate, London EC2
Great Arthur House, Golden Lane Estate, London EC1
Academy House, 161-167 Oxford Street, London W1
King's College London, Bush House Campus, London WC2
Bureau, 90 Fetter Lane, London EC4
Minds pace Aldgate, London E1
Daily Express Building, London EC4
199 Bishopsgate, Broadgate Estate, London EC2
 NEO Bankside, London SE1

Exhibitions 
 #johnremembers - A Personal View of London's Architecture, held at Dream space Gallery in 2017
 Smart Green Spaces, held at The City Centre in 2017
 Unfolding City, held at 111 Southward Street in 2015
Building on the Past, Shaping the Future, held at Bankside Gallery 2013
The Developing City 2050, held at Walbrook House in 2012

Awards 
John Robertson Architects has been shortlisted for numerous awards including:
2015 - Shortlisted NEO Bankside with Rogers Stirk Harbour + Partners, Stirling Prize
2015 - Shortlisted for Aldwych Quarter, Best Refurbished Building, MIPIM Awards
2016 - Shortlisted for Fastest Growing Practice of the Year, AJ100 Awards
2016 - Shortlisted for WeWork Spitalfields, British Council for Offices Awards
2017 - Winner Bracken House, Conservation and Retrofit unbuilt project of the year, NLA Awards
2017 - Shortlisted for The Pepper Store, Devonshire Square, AJ Retrofit Awards
2018 - Shortlisted for Academy House, Conservation and Retrofit, NLA Awards
2018 - Winner for 33 King William Street, Project of the Year, Graphisoft
2018 - Shortlisted for King William Street, Sustainable Practice of the Year, AJ100 Awards
2019 - Winner for Great Arthur House, RIBA National Awards
2019 - Winner for Great Arthur House, RIBA London Awards
2019 - Winner for Academy House, Facades and Cladding, AJ Specification Awards
2019 - Winner BREEAM/Future build Champions, BREEAM Awards
2019 - Winner for Bracken House, BIM Project of the Year, Graphisoft ARCHICAD Awards
2019 - Winner for Great Arthur House, Conservation and Retrofit, NLA Awards
2019 - Shortlisted for 33 King William Street and Bureau, 90 Fetter Lane, Architect of the Year: Offices, bd Awards
2019 - Shortlisted for Bureau, 90 Fetter Lane, Refurbished/Recycled Workplace, British Council for Offices Awards
2019 - Shortlisted, Sustainable Practice of the Year, AJ100 Awards
2019 - Shortlisted for Cannon Green, Mixed Use, NLA Awards
2019 - Shortlisted for Mind space, Workplaces, NLA Awards

References

External links 
John Robertson Architects, official website

Architecture firms based in London